Marauder Car Company Limited was a British car venture by ex-Rover engineers George Mackie and Peter Wilks. After successfully racing their single-seater Marauder racing car the pair left Rover in 1950 and formed Wilks, Mackie and Company to exploit their idea of a two-seater sports car based on the new Rover 75 chassis. In 1951 they changed the company's name to Marauder Car Company.

Around 15 cars were made before a sharp luxury tax imposed on cars priced over £1,000 brought sales to an end and George Mackie and Peter Wilks rejoined Rover.

Design
The design was largely the work of Peter Wilks and "Spen" King who, like Wilks, was a nephew of brothers Spencer and Maurice Wilks who ran  Rover. Spencer King was later famous for his involvement in many Rover and Leyland Group designs.  Though usually considered a sports car their new car was marketed as a Marauder Tourer.

The suspension was stiffened retaining the coil sprung independent front suspension and elliptical sprung live rear axle. In view of the much lighter 2/3-seater (a single bench seat but the seats were separated on the "100") open coachwork the engine was moved back to improve handling and front / rear weight distribution. The Rover gearbox was retained with optional Laycock–de Normanville overdrive but not the Rover free wheel mechanism. The gearchange moved from column to floor. 

Manufacture
Manufacturing started in Dorridge, Solihull, West Midlands and later continued in Kenilworth, Warwickshire between 1950 and 1952. In 1951 Wilks, Mackie and Company's name was changed to Marauder Car Company.

The first few bodies were made by Richard Mead in his Dorridge works and used some Rover panels but later ones were made by Abbey Panels of Coventry. 

About 15 cars were made including 2 of the "100"s before rising costs and tax changes priced the cars out of the market. The UK government doubled the already high level of Purchase Tax on cars with a pre-tax price above £1000. In 1950 the car cost £1236 rising to over £2000 in 1952. 

Both George Mackie and Peter Wilks rejoined Rover.

Note

See also 
 List of car manufacturers of the United Kingdom

References

Sports cars
Defunct motor vehicle manufacturers of England
Cars introduced in 1950
Companies based in the West Midlands (county)
Companies based in Warwickshire